Sam Everon (31 July 1922 – 20 February 1960) was an  Australian rules footballer who played with St Kilda in the Victorian Football League (VFL).

Notes

External links 

1922 births
1960 deaths
Australian rules footballers from Victoria (Australia)
St Kilda Football Club players